Sujirat Pookkham (born 15 March 1986) is a Thai para-badminton player who competes in international elite competitions. She is a World women's singles champion in 2009. Sujirat competed for Thailand at the 2020 Summer Paralympics which she won a silver medal in women's singles WH1 event and another bronze medal in the women's doubles WH1–WH2 event.

Achievements

Paralympic Games 
Women's singles WH1

Women's doubles WH1–WH2

World Championships 
Women's singles

Women’s doubles

Mixed doubles

Asian Para Games 
Women's singles

Women’s doubles

Mixed doubles

Asian Championships 
Women's singles

Women's doubles

Mixed doubles

ASEAN Para Games 

Women's singles

References

Notes

External links
 

1986 births
Living people
Sujirat Pookkham
Sujirat Pookkham
Sujirat Pookkham
Sujirat Pookkham
Sujirat Pookkham
Sujirat Pookkham
Paralympic medalists in badminton
Medalists at the 2020 Summer Paralympics
Badminton players at the 2020 Summer Paralympics
Sujirat Pookkham
Sujirat Pookkham
Sujirat Pookkham